is a railway station in Kashiba, Nara Prefecture, Japan.

Line
Kintetsu Railway
Minami Osaka Line

Layout
The station has  two side platforms and two tracks

Surroundings

 Mount Nijō
 Donzurubō
 Kintetsu Nijō Station

Adjacent stations

Railway stations in Japan opened in 1929
Railway stations in Nara Prefecture